Roselle is a suburb of Chicago and is a village located in both DuPage County and Cook in Illinois. Roselle was first incorporated in 1922 as a bedroom community, with its train stop attracting residents commuting to Chicago or nearby suburbs for their jobs.  As of the 2020 census, the village's population was 22,897.

History 

The area surrounding the current village of Roselle began to be settled in the early 1830s, as settlers moved in next to the native Potawatomi people. Silas L. Meacham and his brothers Harvey and Lyman settled the area now known as Bloomingdale Township. The government had been offering land in the area for around $1.25 / acre. In 1837, Deacon Elijah Hough and his wife settled in the Bloomingdale area, with his sons Oramel,  and daughter Cornelia.

In 1868, at the age of 48, Rosell Hough returned from a career as an alderman and a businessman in Chicago, and saw that the area had become a farming center for corn and flax. He opened the Illinois Linen Company on the northwest corner off of what is now Roselle Road and Irving Park Road. Hough was also the president of the Chicago and Pacific Railroad Company. It is rumored that because of his position, he spent some money to alter a land survey to show that a railroad line should run through Roselle, Itasca and Wood Dale instead of Addison and Bloomingdale. The train schedule misprinted the name of the town on the rail line, giving Roselle its current name.

Geography
Roselle is located at  (41.980569, -88.085438).

Two notable hydrological features are Goose Lake and Spring Creek, a tributary to the East Branch of the DuPage River. Turner Pond is a man-made pond located just north of the town center.

Transportation 
Roselle is roughly bounded by Nerge Road to the north, unincorporated Medinah to the east, Lake Street to the south and Gary Avenue to the west. The main arterial roads of Irving Park Road and Roselle Road run east–west and north–south, respectively, through the central commercial area of Roselle.

Bicycle trails link the nearby cities of Schaumburg and Bloomingdale. The North Central DuPage Regional Trail runs through far southeastern portions of Roselle.

Roselle has a station on Metra's Milwaukee District/West Line, which provides daily rail service between Elgin and Chicago Union Station.

Demographics

As of the 2020 census there were 22,897 people, 8,519 households, and 6,134 families residing in the village. The racial makeup of the village was 75.01% White, 2.56% African American, 0.35% Native American, 10.66% Asian, 0.04% Pacific Islander, 3.71% from other races, and 7.68% from two or more races. Hispanic or Latino of any race were 11.39% of the population.

There were 8,519 households, out of which 49.65% had children under the age of 18 living with them, 58.34% were married couples living together, 11.64% had a female householder with no husband present, and 28.00% were non-families. 22.15% of all households were made up of individuals, and 9.14% had someone living alone who was 65 years of age or older. The average household size was 3.16 and the average family size was 2.66.

The village's age distribution consisted of 20.7% under the age of 18, 9.7% from 18 to 24, 25.3% from 25 to 44, 29.8% from 45 to 64, and 14.4% who were 65 years of age or older. The median age was 40.6 years. For every 100 females, there were 87.3 males. For every 100 females age 18 and over, there were 88.8 males.

The median income for a household in the village was $92,470, and the median income for a family was $107,719. Males had a median income of $60,901 versus $41,015 for females. The per capita income for the village was $40,589. About 3.4% of families and 4.4% of the population were below the poverty line, including 4.7% of those under age 18 and 5.0% of those age 65 or over.

Business 
There are three main commercially zoned areas in the village. One is along the southern border of the town along Lake Street (U.S. Route 20), the second is in the center of the village near the historical center of Park Street and Irving Park Road (Illinois Route 19). In 2005, a new downtown business development opened along the Soo Line Railroad tracks just north of the town center (Main Street Station).  The third is along Nerge Road, the northern edge of the village. Plans are currently underway for the redevelopment of the Downtown District in addition to Main Street Station. The several phase project is collectively known as Village Crossing. Roselle is home to Lynfred Winery, established in 1979. What started off as a retirement hobby by Fred and Lynn Koehler, now producing over 120 varietals of wine and over 50,000 cases of wine yearly.

Schools

Roselle is served by Lake Park Community High School District 108. Portions of western Roselle are served by Keeneyville School District 20, whose Waterbury Elementary school is located in Roselle. Parts of eastern Roselle are served by Medinah School District 11, whose middle school is located in the village. Parts of northern Roselle fall within Schaumburg School Districts 54 and southern within Bloomingdale School District 13. 
Non-public elementary schools in Roselle include St. Walter Catholic School, Trinity Lutheran and Medinah Baptist.

Notable people 

 Don Schulze, pitcher for five Major League Baseball teams including the Chicago Cubs in 1983-84; born in Roselle
 Don Sunderlage, All-Star point guard with the Milwaukee Hawks and Minneapolis Lakers; born in Roselle
 Mark Gorski, track cyclist and winner of gold medal in 1984 Olympics in Los Angeles, attended Lake Park High School.
Glenn Kotche, an American drummer and composer, best known for his involvement in the band Wilco. He was named the 40th greatest drummer of all time by Gigwise in 2008. Attended Lake Park High School.

References

External links
 Village of Roselle official website
 Lake Park High School

 
Villages in Cook County, Illinois
Villages in DuPage County, Illinois
Villages in Illinois
Chicago metropolitan area
Populated places established in 1922
1922 establishments in Illinois